Temnoscheila chlorodia, also called the green bark-gnawing beetle or green bark beetle, is a species of bark-gnawing beetle. It is found in North America west of the Great Plains.

Description 
Adults are dark metallic green or blue and 9–20 mm in length. Larvae are pink or white with a dark head and thoracic shield and an anal plate with two spurs.

Behavior 
Adults and larvae alike are predators that forage under the bark of dead trees. They can also be found in the nests of other wood-boring insects and in wood-decay fungus. Adults are most abundant during late spring, with a second peak in late summer.

References 

Trogossitidae
Insects described in 1843